Patrick Aga was elected Senator for the Nasarawa North constituency of Nasarawa State, Nigeria at the start of the Nigerian Fourth Republic, running on the People's Democratic Party (PDP) platform. He took office on 29 May 1999.
After taking his seat in the Senate in June 1999, he was appointed to committees on Ethics, Judiciary, Women Affairs, Commerce, Education, Special Projects and Local & Foreign Debts (vice chairman).

In the run-up to the 2003 elections, Aga transferred to the Alliance for Democracy (AD) party in the hope of being elected Nasarawa governor on that platform.
After the elections the AD party split into two rival factions. 
In December 2003 Aga was appointed national vice chairman for the North-Central region in the faction headed by Chief Adebisi Akande.

References

Living people
People from Nasarawa State
Peoples Democratic Party members of the Senate (Nigeria)
Alliance for Democracy (Nigeria) politicians
20th-century Nigerian politicians
21st-century Nigerian politicians
Year of birth missing (living people)